The 2001–02 season was Motherwell's 4th season in the Scottish Premier League, and their 17th consecutive season in the top division of Scottish football.

Amid growing financial concerns, several key players were sold during the pre-season in order to reduce the club's wage bill. Nine new players were signed, but Motherwell struggled early in the season, resulting in the sacking of manager Billy Davies in September. Eric Black was appointed as his replacement, and over the course the season the club slowly pulled away from bottom-placed St Johnstone to ease any relegation worries. The club's financial situation worsened however, and in April 2002, John Boyle announced that the club would be entering administration. Eric Black and chief executive Pat Nevin resigned from their positions, with Terry Butcher becoming the club's third manager of the season. A week later, following the last game of the season, 19 players were released by the club, including nine players who were still under contract.

Season review
Motherwell announced the signing of David Kelly to a one-year contract on 2 July, with Roberto Martínez signing a day later to a three-year contract.

On 16 March, Franck Bernhard joined Motherwell from RC Strasbourg, whilst Paul Harvey left the club to join Stenhousemuir.

On 29 April, Motherwell released 17 players after going into administration.

Squad

Transfers

In

Out

Released

Competitions

Premier League

League table

Results summary

Results by round

Results

Scottish Cup

League Cup

Squad statistics

Appearances

|-
|colspan="14"|Players who appeared for Motherwell who left during the season:

|}

Goal scorers

Clean sheets

Disciplinary record

See also
 List of Motherwell F.C. seasons

References

External links
Soccerbase

2001-02
Scottish football clubs 2001–02 season